Donte Rakeem Moncrief (born August 6, 1993) is an former American football wide receiver. He played college football at Ole Miss, and was drafted by the Indianapolis Colts in the third round of the 2014 NFL Draft.

High school career
A native of Raleigh, Mississippi, Moncrief attended Raleigh High School. He registered 21 catches for 441 yards and 9 touchdowns as a senior while also passing for 365 yards with 2 touchdowns and rushing 12 times for 144 yards. He also returned two punts for touchdowns. He collected 48 tackles, four for loss, and four interceptions on defense.

In addition to football, Moncrief also competed in track & field for the Lions, where he was one of the state's top performers in the long jump. He was a two-time 3A state champion in the long jump event, with a personal-best mark of 7.76 meters (25-1.5).

Considered a four-star recruit by Rivals.com, he was rated as the 17th best wide receiver prospect in the nation.

College career
Moncrief attended the University of Mississippi from 2011 to 2013. During his collegiate career, he had 156 receptions for 2,371 yards and 20 touchdowns.

Moncrief announced on January 3, 2014 that he would forgo his senior season and enter the 2014 NFL Draft.

Professional career

Indianapolis Colts
Moncrief was drafted in the third round, with the 90th overall pick, by the Indianapolis Colts on May 9, 2014. On May 30, the Colts officially signed him to his rookie contract. On October 26, 2014, in a game vs. the Pittsburgh Steelers, Moncrief scored his first NFL touchdown on a pass from quarterback Andrew Luck. In week 13, Moncrief had 3 receptions for a career-high 134 yards and 2 touchdowns to help the Colts beat the Washington Redskins 49–27. He finished his rookie season with 32 receptions for 444 yards and 3 touchdowns.

In 2015, he had a career-high 64 receptions for 733 yards and six touchdowns. In 2016, Moncrief missed six games with a shoulder sprain and another with a hamstring issue but still managed to catch seven touchdowns. In 2017 he had a career-low 26 catches, due to injuries of his own as well as Luck missing the entire season.

Jacksonville Jaguars
On March 15, 2018, Moncrief signed a one-year, $9.6 million fully guaranteed contract with the Jacksonville Jaguars. In Week 4, in a victory over the New York Jets, Moncrief totaled five receptions for 109 yards and a touchdown. He finished the season with 48 receptions for 668 yards and three touchdowns.

Pittsburgh Steelers
On March 14, 2019, Moncrief signed a two-year deal with the Pittsburgh Steelers.
Moncrief made his debut with the Steelers in Week 1 against the New England Patriots.  In the game, Moncrief caught 3 passes for 7 yards in the 33–3 loss. He was released on November 2, 2019, after putting up just four catches for 18 yards through five games.

Carolina Panthers
On November 4, 2019, Moncrief was claimed off waivers by the Carolina Panthers. He was released on December 6, 2019.

Moncrief had a tryout with the San Francisco 49ers on August 13, 2020, and with the New York Jets on August 19, 2020.

New York Jets
On August 31, 2020, Moncrief signed with the New York Jets. He was released on September 5, 2020, and signed to the practice squad the next day. He was placed on the practice squad/injured list on September 10, and activated back to the practice squad on October 7. He was released on October 14.

New England Patriots
On November 4, 2020, the New England Patriots signed Moncrief to their practice squad. He was elevated to the active roster on November 21 and November 28 for the team's weeks 11 and 12 games against the Houston Texans and Arizona Cardinals, and reverted to the practice squad after each game. Against the Cardinals, Moncrief had a 53-yard kick return. On December 5, 2020, he was signed to the active roster.

Houston Texans
Moncrief signed a one-year contract with the Houston Texans on March 22, 2021. Moncrief was released by the Texans on July 27.

Retirement
On February 18, 2023, Moncrief announced his retirement.

NFL career statistics

References

External links
Jacksonville Jaguars bio
Indianapolis Colts bio
Ole Miss Rebels bio 

1993 births
Living people
People from Raleigh, Mississippi
Players of American football from Mississippi
African-American players of American football
American football wide receivers
Ole Miss Rebels football players
Indianapolis Colts players
Jacksonville Jaguars players
Pittsburgh Steelers players
Carolina Panthers players
New York Jets players
New England Patriots players
Houston Texans players
21st-century African-American sportspeople